Margaret Elphinstone (born 1948) is a Scottish author of novels, short stories and poetry. She is known especially for The Sea Road, a re-telling of the Viking exploration of the North Atlantic.

Biography
Margaret Elphinstone was born in Kent, England. At one point she studied at Queen's College in London. She also graduated with a degree in English from Durham University. She was until recently, Professor of Writing in the Department of English Studies at the University of Strathclyde in Glasgow, now retired. Her academic research areas are Scottish writers and the literature of Scotland's offshore islands.

She did extensive study tours in Iceland, Greenland, Labrador and the United States. She lived for eight years in the Shetland Islands and is the mother of two children.

Before becoming professor in Glasgow in 2003, she worked at a variety of jobs in different locations. Some of her experiences were later used in her books:

Islanders is based on her participation in archaeological excavations on the Shetland island of Papa Stour.
Two garden books emerged after her work as a gardener in Galloway.
Voyageurs arose after a one-year stay at Central Michigan University and canoeing adventures on the Ottawa River.

Bibliography
 1985 "Spinning the Green", short story
 1987 The Incomer or Clachanpluck, novel. 
 1989 A Sparrow's Flight, novel. 
 1991 An Apple from a tree, short stories. 
 1994 Islanders, novel. 
 2000 The Sea Road, novel. (Ger 2001: Der Weg nach Vinland), based on the life of Gudrid of Iceland
 2002 Hy Brasil, novel. (Ger 2004: Inselnotizen), based on the mythical island of Brasil
 2003 Voyageurs, novel. (Ger 2006: Stromaufwärts)
 2006 Light, novel. 
 2009 The Gathering Night, novel. 

...

Prizes 

 1990 Scottish Arts Council Writer's Bursary
 1991 Scottish Arts Council Travel Award 
for The Sea Road
 1993 Scottish Arts Council Writer's Bursary
 1994 Scottish Arts Council Travel Award
 2001 Scottish Arts Council Spring Book Award 
for Hy Brasil
 1997 Scottish Arts Council Writer's Bursary 
for Voyageurs
 2000 Scottish Arts Council Writer's Bursary

Reviews
 Gladstone, Mary (1987), A New Promise, a review of The Incomer, in Cencrastus No. 28, Winter 87/88, pp. 14 & 15,

References

External links
Website of Margaret Elphinstone
Margaret Elphinstone in booksfromscotland.com
Margaret Elphinstone in Contemporary Writers in the UK
Science fiction (German)
Scottish Arts Council
Margaret Elphinstone: Stromaufwärts. List Verlag 2006, p. 2 below. 522 pp., 

1948 births
Living people
Scottish women novelists
Scottish historical novelists
Academics of the University of Strathclyde
People educated at Queen's College, London
Writers from Glasgow
20th-century Scottish novelists
21st-century Scottish novelists
20th-century Scottish women writers
21st-century Scottish women writers
Women historical novelists
Alumni of St Mary's College, Durham